Inner peace (or peace of mind) refers to a deliberate state of psychological or spiritual calm despite the potential presence of stressors. Being "at peace" is considered by many to be healthy (homeostasis) and the opposite of being stressed or anxious, and is considered to be a state where our mind performs at an optimal level with positive outcomes. Peace of mind is thus generally associated with bliss, happiness and contentment.

Peace of mind, serenity, and calmness are descriptions of a disposition free from the effects of stress.  In some cultures, inner peace is considered a state of consciousness or enlightenment that may be cultivated by various forms of training, such as breathing exercises, prayer, meditation, tai chi or yoga, for example.  Many spiritual practices refer to this peace as an experience of knowing oneself.

People have difficulties embracing their inner spirituality because everyday stressors get the best of them; finding peace and happiness in the little joys of life can seem difficult, and results do not seem all that gratifying. Achieving spirituality is a step-by-step process; there are ways through which one can become more spiritual every day.

Tenzin Gyatso, the current and 14th Dalai Lama, emphasizes the importance of inner peace in the world:

See also

 Ataraxia
 Equanimity
 Enlightenment
 Hesychia
 Inner light
 Meaning of life
 Nirvana
 Gelassenheit
 Self-actualization
 Self-ownership
 Self-realization
 Shanti Mantras
 Tranquillity
 Mindfulness
 Meditation
 Inner conflict

Further reading

References

External links

Peace
Meditation
Psychological concepts
Spiritual gifts